Sychevsky is a rural locality (a khutor) in Upornikovskoye Rural Settlement, Nekhayevsky District, Volgograd Oblast, Russia. The population was 9 as of 2010.

Geography 
Sychevsky is located 8 km south of Nekhayevskaya (the district's administrative centre) by road. Nekhayevskaya is the nearest rural locality.

References 

Rural localities in Nekhayevsky District